Donationware is a licensing model that supplies fully operational unrestricted software to the user and requests an optional donation be paid to the programmer or a third-party beneficiary (usually a non-profit). The amount of the donation may also be stipulated by the author, or it may be left to the discretion of the user, based on individual perceptions of the software's value. Since donationware comes fully operational (i.e. not crippleware/freemium) when payment is optional, it is a type of freeware.

History 
An example of donationware is the 1987 Atari ST video game Ballerburg, whose programmer distributed the game for free but asked for a donation, offering as incentive the source code for the game. Red Ryder was a terminal emulation software program created for the Apple Macintosh in the 1980s that used donations to fund development..

See also 
 Careware, where the software developer requests a donation to charity
 Gift economy
 Participatory organization
 Pay what you want

References

External links 
 Jesse Reichler (2006) Donationware experience – An article describing experiments with donationware at Donationcoder.

Software licenses
Revenue models